Porky's Railroad is a Warner Bros. Looney Tunes cartoon directed by Frank Tashlin. The short was released on August 7, 1937, and stars Porky Pig.

Plot
The short begins with many views of the #515 4-4-2 Atlantic type steam engine, Alfred, after the title card appears to be showing the front of the train and the engine. A message appears reading: "The 30th Century Limited, the railroad's crack train." Alfred blows his whistle 4 times and rings the bell 2 times. The song "California, Here I Come" plays in the background until Porky's scene comes along (The same 4-4-2 engine later appeared on the Merrie Melodies short "Steamlined Greta Green"). After many scenes of the 4-4-2 engine (which will show later in the short), it fades black to Porky and his 2-2-2 typed engine (#13 "Toots" ), because Porky immediately enjoys riding his "15th Century Unlimited (also a crack train — everything cracked including the engineer)." Many single-chime toots are heard while the train jumps for power. The train then tries to climb up the Piker's Peak, a steep hill. The train stops halfway up the hill. Porky then opens its firebox, which contains only a candle. Porky then opens its second seat-box to find a pepper shaker, and sprinkles pepper all over the candle. Toots starts to sneeze repeatedly as the train starts to move faster, rocketing up and over the hill and Down pov Porky then manages to go through tunnels, scenery, etc. Porky then speeds up to a railway yard, in which his 10 boxcars and caboose are scattered onto various sidings, but eventually all coast back to the mainline and reassemble themselves into a train. Alfred later makes the appearance again, blowing his whistle again 3 more times. But Porky sees it coming through the window after looking at some scenery. Porky then tries to find a passing siding. He parks his engine, 10 boxcars and caboose on the siding at the Portis station. He notices that he has little room, and has to shift his train forwards slightly as the other train passes so that it will miss hitting either end. Porky feels relieved that Alfred has passed by without serious incident. Porky has to stop for a cow who is lying on the track, asking her politely to move out of the way, but is quite annoyed when the cow ignores him; so instead Porky tries to tell her again. The cow ignores him again, so instead of reminding the third time, he tries to push the cow's rear end, but ends up falling on the track after the cow gets up and leaves. Porky then angrily gets back on his locomotive, shovelling more coal into his firebox (candle). A bull then arrives marching, crossing the tracks and lies behind a bush with only his tail visible, draped across one rail. Porky then tries to start up his engine, but sees the bull's tail (thinking it is still the cow) and then angrily gets off the train, and tries to teach the "cow" a lesson. He calls the bull a four-legged piece of hamburger (and also something unintelligible — see next section). He pulls the bull's tail angrily. The bull yells as Porky starts to jump and spin. He immediately hops into the engine's cab and continues his journey, this time at a furious speed around several bends.

The Silver Fish
Meanwhile, at the dispatch center, a message is waiting, forcing Porky to stop his train. Porky stops at the dispatch center, waiting for the message. He reads it after a clothes line with an envelope pegged on it comes his way. It reads that the "Silver Fish" is coming, from the President "I. FULLER CINDERS". Porky is informed that his beloved train engine, the 13 named 'Toots', is to be replaced by a streamline train by the name of 'The Silver Fish'. The engineer, an anthropomorphized dog character, greets the audience by riding on the fish, blasting his single-chimed horn. The Silver Fish then arrives in a flash after Porky starts to break down to say goodbye to his engine, Toots. Porky tries to greet the driver, who violent shakes Porky hand, sending him sprawling on the ground. When the driver of 'The Silver Fish' insults 'Toots' by calling her a "percolator on a roller skate", Toots deflates like a leaky balloon into a heap. Porky mutters that his train can easily take on the streamline train. The driver takes Porky's bluster seriously and agrees to a race after lifting Porky up and poking him twice in the eyes.

The race
An anthropomorphized dog character waits with his stopwatch. And then, "bang" goes the pistol, and the race starts as the dog character puts away his stopwatch. The "Silver Fish" leads in a flash while Porky's boxcars are left all tied up in a knot, shocking the dog character who is watching Porky's engine. Further sequences show the "Silver Fish" leading at a very high speed, forcing a pile of logs to break loose while a man hides inside, looking at the camera, shocked. The "Silver Fish", however, then immediately blasts through a tunnel, turning it inside out. The "Silver Fish" then stops at the liftbridge. A slow boat then goes underneath the bridge halfway. A caricature fish reminiscent of Mae West then pops up out of the water and admires the "Silver Fish", speaking in West's customary way. "Toots" then immediately catches up with Porky blowing his whistle a couple of times. As the boat "S.S. Leon" (for Leon Schlesinger) starts to pass under the liftbridge with the bascules partway up, Porky makes it across with no damage, nor even derailment. Some equipment is left on the train from the boat, including a lifeboat with a sailor singing a song while rowing, which is hanging by davits on one boxcar's left side. The bull, who appeared earlier, remembers the train and how Porky pulled his tail, thinking to himself that Porky "can't get away with a thing like that," and begins charging Porky's train from the rear. The bull rushes while yelling, and smashes through the caboose and the boxcars. The bull then butts the locomotive, sending "Toots" upwards and over the "Silver Fish", much to its driver's astonishment. Another anthropomorphized dog character raises the checkered flag as Porky wins the race with a crash back to the ground after his unexpected flight. In the end, Porky (who is shown blowing the horn) becomes the new engineer of the "Silver Fish", whilst a battered, irreparably damaged "Toots" is on a trailer behind with "Headin' for the last roundhouse" (a play on a well known song by Billy Hill) written on a sign attached to it as the cartoon ends.

Sequence with reversed audio
In the scene in which Porky pulls the bull's tail, some of his speech is garbled. When played backwards, however, Porky's words here are "...Toots old gal, d-d-don't pop your b-b-b-b...".

In-jokes
When a woodpile is knocked over there is a brief view of a black man, a derogatory visual reference from the cartoonists to the then commonly used term "a nigger in the woodpile". During the race, Porky runs his train over the top of a boat called the 'S.S Leon', a gag dedicated to the cartoon's producer Leon Schlesinger.  Also, the Morse Code heard is a message to write "QST QSL Leon Schlesinger Hollywood picture of Porky"

See also
1937 in film
List of public domain cartoons

References

External links

Porky's Railroad on the Internet Archive
Porky's Railroad (Colorized) on the Internet Archive

1937 films
Animated films about trains
Looney Tunes shorts
Warner Bros. Cartoons animated short films
1930s American animated films
Short films directed by Frank Tashlin
Porky Pig films
Films set on trains